Ridyard is a locational surname of British origin, which means a person from the village of Rudyard, Staffordshire. Related names include Rudyard, Rudgard, and Rudyer. The name may refer to:

Alf Ridyard (1908–1981), British football player
Eveline Ridyard (1898–1973), British politician
Martyn Ridyard (born 1986), British rugby league player

Other uses
Albert Ridyard Three-Decker, historic house in Massachusetts
B. E. Ridyard Three-Decker, historic house in Massachusetts

References

Surnames of British Isles origin